Rudolphina Menzel (1891–1973) was a cynologist, best known for her work in the field of animal behavior, from Vienna, Austria. She was responsible for gaining recognition for the Canaan Dog; and she wrote the breed standard, which was accepted by the FCI in 1966.

Biography
Rudolphina Menzel immigrated with her husband Dr Rudolph Menzel to Palestine in 1938.

Scientific career
She was asked by the Haganah for help in setting up a dog section (forerunner to what would become Unit Oketz). Dr. Menzel found that the standard breeds used for guarding, tracking and other tasks were unable to cope with the harsh climate and terrain, so she sought an alternative, turning to the local pariah dog.

She began a redomestication program of the pariah dogs living on the outskirts of settlements and with the Bedouin in the desert. She collected puppies and adults, and found them to be highly adaptable, amenable to domestication, and quick to learn.

Menzel's Canaan Dog breeding program was concentrated with the Institute where a foundation of kennel-raised Canaan Dogs was established, carrying the name "B'nei Habitachon".

In 1965, she exported the four Canaan Dogs to the United States, and later sent specimens of the breed to Germany.

Menzel sent a male Canaan Dog to Mrs Connie Higgins in the United Kingdom. In 1964, Mrs. Higgins had already acquired a female puppy from a wild litter in Damascus, and on 28 December 1969, she bred the first known litter of Canaan Dogs born in the United Kingdom.

In 1970, Shaar Hagai Kennels, located near Jerusalem, worked closely with Dr. Menzel in the development and breeding of the breed, and continued her work after her death in 1973.

References

External links
 The personal papers of Rudolphina Menzel are kept at the Central Zionist Archives in Jerusalem. The notation of the record group is A293.

Canaan Dogs from Bnei HaBitachon Kennel Web page displaying the Canaan dogs belonging to Drs. Rudolph and Rudolphina Menzel, the founders of the breed
History of The Canaan Dog
A Biblical dog in modern times

Report on the Canaan Dog Report by the Israel Nature Reserves and National Parks Authority on the Canaan Dog, written by Dr. Tamar Ron, October 1999
Pariahunde - Pariah Dogs, written by Rudolf Menzel & Rudolphina Menzel, translated by Bryna Comsky

1891 births
1973 deaths
20th-century Austrian zoologists
Austrian Jews
Jewish emigrants from Austria to Mandatory Palestine after the Anschluss
Cynologists
Scientists from Vienna